Archithosia flavifrontella is a moth of the  subfamily Arctiinae. It was described by Embrik Strand in 1912. It is found in Equatorial Guinea, Nigeria and Uganda.

References

Moths described in 1912
Lithosiini
Moths of Africa